Sulev Keedus (born 21 July 1957 in Tallinn) is an Estonian film director who studied at the Gerasimov Institute of Cinematography in Moscow.

Selected filmography
 Luigeluum (1982)
 Ainus pühapäev (1990)
 Georgica (1998)
 Somnambulance (2003)
 A Family (2004)
 Tormis' Sledge of Song (2005)
 Ruudi (2006)
 Travelling Light (2006)
 Jonathan from Australia (2007)
 Letters to Angel (2011)
 The Russians on Crow Island (2012)
 The Manslayer/The Virgin/The Shadow (2017)
 War (2017)
 Kellamängumaastikud (2020)

References

External links

Living people
1957 births
Estonian film directors
Estonian screenwriters
Recipients of the Order of the White Star, 4th Class
Tallinn University alumni
People from Tallinn